HMS Dryad was the name ship of the s.  She was launched at Chatham Dockyard on 22 November 1893, the first of the class to be completed.  She served as a minesweeper during World War I and was broken up in 1920.

Design
Ordered under the Naval Defence Act of 1889, which established the "Two-Power Standard", the class was contemporary with the first torpedo boat destroyers. Dryad was engined by Maudslay, Sons & Field with two sets of vertical triple-expansion steam engines, two locomotive-type boilers, and twin screws. She carried between 100 and 160 tons of coal and was manned by 120 sailors and officers.

Armament
The armament when built comprised two QF  guns, four 6-pounder guns and a single 5-barrelled Nordenfelt machine gun.  Her primary weapon was five 18-inch (450-mm) torpedo tubes, with two reloads.  On conversion to a minesweeper in 1914 two of the five torpedoes were removed.

Service history

Mediterranean service
Dryad deployed to Crete in February 1897 to operate as part of the International Squadron, a multinational force made up of ships of the Austro-Hungarian Navy, French Navy, Imperial German Navy, Italian Royal Navy (Regia Marina), Imperial Russian Navy, and Royal Navy that intervened in the 1897-1898 Greek uprising on Crete against rule by the Ottoman Empire. On 21 February 1897, she joined the British battleship  and torpedo gunboat , the Russian battleship Imperator Aleksandr II, the Austro-Hungarian armored cruiser , and the German protected cruiser  in the International Squadron's first direct offensive action, a brief bombardment of Cretan insurgent positions on the heights east of Canea (now Chania) after the insurgents refused the squadron's order to take down a Greek flag they had raised.

In December 1899, Dryad was commissioned for more service on the Mediterranean Station. On 14 January 1900 Dryad left Chatham for the Mediterranean in order to relieve , which returned to Devonport to pay off. She was stationed at Souda Bay until March 1900, when she returned to the station garrison at Malta. Later the same month she was posted to Alexandria as a port ship. In June 1902 she was lent to the East Indies Squadron for special service in the Gulf of Aden, returning to Malta in late September.

Tender to the Navigation School
In 1906 she was chosen as the tender to the Navigation School, conducting navigation training of officers at sea.

On 20 June 1907, Dryad rescued the crew of  after the torpedo boat sank without loss of life during afternoon steam trials in the English Channel off Torquay, England, when her propeller shaft broke and punctured her hull.

Wartime service as a minesweeper

By 1914 Dryad had been converted to a minesweeper and was operating in the North Sea from the port of Lowestoft.
Four gunners from Dryad were assigned to the Q-ship Inverlyon.  which on 15 August 1915 sank the German submarine  with gunfire.

Disposal
She was renamed Hamadryad in 1918 and was sold to H Auten & Co on 24 September 1920 for breaking.

Notes

Citations

Bibliography

 

 McTiernan, Mick, A Very Bad Place Indeed For a Soldier. The British involvement in the early stages of the European Intervention in Crete. 1897 - 1898, King's College, London, September 2014.
 

 

Dryad-class torpedo gunboats
Ships built in Chatham
1893 ships
Victorian-era gunboats of the United Kingdom
World War I minesweepers of the United Kingdom
Maritime incidents in 1907